Larbert Parish is a civil parish of Murray County, New South Wales.

It is halfway between Ulladulla and Canberra. It includes most of the locality of Larbert.

References

Geography of New South Wales
Parishes of Murray County
Queanbeyan–Palerang Regional Council